Independent Croatia and Serbia established diplomatic relations on 9 September 1996, following the end of the Croatian War of Independence (March 1991—November 1995). From 1918 to 1991, both countries were part of Yugoslavia (the Kingdom of Yugoslavia and later Socialist Federal Republic of Yugoslavia). They now share 241 kilometers of common border. According to the 2011 Croatian census, there were 186,633 Serbs living in Croatia. According to the 2011 Serbian census, there were 57,900 Croats living in Serbia. Smaller lasting disputes include border disputes over the Island of Šarengrad and the Island of Vukovar. Serbian and Croatian are mutually intelligible standardized varieties of the Serbo-Croatian language and are official in Serbia and Croatia respectively.

Croatia has an embassy in Belgrade and a general consulate in Subotica. Serbia has an embassy in Zagreb and two general consulates, one in Rijeka and one in Vukovar.

Background

With the nation-building process in the mid-19th century, the first Croatian–Serbian tensions appeared. Serbia's minister Ilija Garašanin's Načertanije (1844) claimed lands that were inhabited by Bulgarians, Macedonians, Albanians, Montenegrins, Bosnians, Hungarians and Croats as part of Greater Serbia. Garašanin's plan also envisioned methods of spreading Serbian influence in the claimed lands. He proposed ways to influence Croats, who Garašanin regarded as "Serbs of Catholic faith". Serbian linguist Vuk Karadžić considered Croatians, who spoke Shtokavian dialect, "Catholic Serbs". Croatia was at the time a kingdom in the Habsburg monarchy, with Dalmatia and Istria being separate Habsburg Crown lands. Croatian thinker and politician Ante Starčević, an advocate of Croatian unity and independence, who was both anti-Habsburg and anti-Serbian in outlook, envisioned the creation of Greater Croatia that would include territories inhabited by Bosniaks, Serbs, and Slovenes, considering Bosniaks and Serbs to be Croats who had been converted to Islam and Orthodox Christianity, while considering the Slovenes to be "mountain Croats". Starčević, who in 1861 co-founded a nationalist and irredentist Party of Rights, argued that the significant Serb presence in territories claimed by Greater Croatia was the result of recent settlement, encouraged by Habsburg rulers, and the influx of groups like Vlachs who converted to Orthodox Christianity and came to identify themselves as Serbs. Starčević admired Bosniaks because in his view they were Croats who had adopted Islam in order to preserve the economic and political autonomy of Bosnia and Ottoman Croatia. After Austria-Hungary occupied Bosnia and Herzegovina in 1878 and Serbia gained its independence from Ottoman Empire, Croatian and Serbian relations deteriorated as both sides had pretensions on Bosnia and Herzegovina. In 1902, major anti-Serb riots in the Kingdom of Croatia-Slavonia were provoked by a re-publication by the Zagreb-based Serb Independent Party of an article authored by a Serb Nikola Stojanović that was titled Srbi i Hrvati ("Serbs and Croats"), also known as Do istrage vaše ili naše ("Till the Annihilation, Yours or Ours"). Stojanović denied the existence of the Croatian nation and forecast the result of the "inevitable" Serbian–Croatian conflict:

In World War I, ethnic Croats fought in the Austro-Hungarian Army against the Kingdom of Serbia, while Croatian general Ivan Salis-Seewis was a military governor of occupied Serbia. Some Croat POWs volunteered to fight in Thessaloniki battlefront with Serbian Army. On 29 October 1918, the Croatian Parliament (Sabor) declared independence from Austria-Hungary and decided to join the newly formed State of Slovenes, Croats and Serbs which on 1 December 1918 entered a union with the Kingdom of Serbia and formed the Kingdom of Serbs, Croats and Slovenes. Initial Croatian zeal for the new state faded away as the republican view of a new state was ignored, especially since the concept of Greater Serbia was put in practice during the early 1920s, under the Yugoslav premiership of Nikola Pašić. Using tactics of police intimidation and vote rigging, he diminished the role of the oppositions (mainly those loyal to his Croatian rival, Stjepan Radić) to his government in parliament, creating an environment for centralization of power in the hands of the Serbs in general and Serbian politicians in particular. Police violence further alienated Croats, who began to ask for their own state. On 20 June 1928, Stjepan Radić and five other Croat politicians (supported by a vast majority of Croats) were shot in the National Assembly in Belgrade by a Serb deputy Puniša Račić, enraged by continuous Croatian claims that they were "exploited by Serbia and that Serbia is treating them like a colony." This led to the royal dictatorship of King Alexander in January 1929. The dictatorship formally ended in 1931 when the king imposed a more unitarian constitution and changed the name of the country to Yugoslavia. The Croatian Peasant Party, now led by Vladko Maček who succeeded Radić, continued to advocate federalization of Yugoslavia, resulting in the Cvetković–Maček Agreement of August 1939 and the autonomous Banovina of Croatia.

In April 1941, Yugoslavia was occupied by Germany and Italy who created a puppet-state called the Independent State of Croatia (NDH) which was governed by the pro-Axis Ustasha organization. The Ustashas sought to create ethnically pure Greater Croatia by cleansing Serbs as well as Jews and Roma from its territory. The Ustashas regime systematically murdered around 300,000–350,000 Serbs, as a part of a genocide campaign. Approximately 100,000 people, primarily Serbs, Roma and Jews and others were murdered in Jasenovac concentration camp alone. The predominantly Serb Chetniks, a Yugoslav royalist and Serbian nationalist movement and guerrilla force, engaged in war crimes and ethnic cleansing of Muslims and Croats in order to establish Greater Serbia, while also supporting the reinstatement of a Serbian monarchy. Some historians view these crimes as constituting genocide. The most recent estimates on the number of Muslims and Croats deaths caused by the Chetniks in Croatia and Bosnia and Herzegovina range from 47,000 to 65,000. Following the victory of Yugoslav Partisans, who were led by Croatian communist Josip Broz Tito, the Ustashas and the Chetniks were defeated. Yugoslav communists abolished the monarchy and established one-party socialist republic and a federation governed by the League of Communists of Yugoslavia. Newly formed socialist Yugoslav state under Tito's benevolent dictatorship was made up of six socialist republics including SR Serbia and SR Croatia.

Yugoslav wars and establishment of diplomatic relations

The period of 1991 to 1995 is marked as the Croatian War of Independence. Serbs living in Croatia stimulated by Serbian leadership established Republic of Serbian Krajina, which captured a third of the whole territory of Croatia, occupied by the remnants of the Serbian-controlled Yugoslav People's Army (from FR Yugoslavia) from 1991 to 1992 and supported by the Federal Republic of Yugoslavia through military support. The reason for the Federal Republic of Yugoslavia to support the Republic of Serbian Krajina against Croatian forces were common interests in upholding the status quo of keeping ethnic Serbs of former Yugoslav territories united, either within the extant Yugoslav state or as satellite states serving as proxies to Belgrade. The war killed some 20,000 people from both sides. An estimated 170,000 to 250,000 Croats and other non-Serbs were expelled from parts of Croatia overrun by Serb forces and hundreds of Croatian and other non-Serbian civilians were killed.   During the Croatian military's Operation Storm in August 1995, around 250,000 Serbs fled from their homes and hundreds of Serb civilians were killed.

Following the war in Croatia, the two countries established diplomatic relations on 9 September 1996. Croatia filed a genocide lawsuit against Serbia at the International Court of Justice in 1999, and after Zagreb declined requests to withdraw it, Belgrade filed a countersuit in 2010. Both lawsuits were dismissed on 3 February 2015, as International Criminal Tribunal for the former Yugoslavia found no evidence to support either claim. The court ruled that both sides undoubtedly committed crimes, but they were not committed with genocidal intent so they are not considered genocide according to the Court's definition of genocide.

In 2005, Croatia ratified a bilateral agreement with Serbia and Montenegro on the protection of the Serbian and Montenegrin minority in Croatia and the Croatian national minority in Serbia and Montenegro.

Relations since 2010 
In May 2014, floodwaters in southeastern Europe caused greatest damages to Serbia and Bosnia and Herzegovina, while Croatia suffered to a lesser extent. Croatia provided military transport, a number of rescuers and 65 tons of drinking water to affected areas in Serbia. The Croatian Red Cross donated €71,386.90 to Bosnia and Herzegovina and €57,168.47 to Serbia for victims of the floods.

In April 2018, Serbian minister Aleksandar Vulin was proclaimed persona non grata in Croatia for making a statement that: "only the Supreme Commander of the Serbian Army – Aleksandar Vučić – can decide about me entering in Croatia, not Croatian ministers." Throughout the years, Vulin has made a reputation of a man often insulting Croatian officials and Croatian state by calling them fascists, ustašas, criminals in his public statements. As a response to that, Serbian authorities banned Damir Krstičević, then defense minister of Croatia, from entering Serbia.

In the same month, as Croatian delegation was visiting the National Assembly of Serbia, ultranationalist Serb politician Vojislav Šešelj accompanied by members of his Serbian Radical Party trampled the Croatian flag in front of Croatian delegation. In response, Croatian delegation led by Goran Jandroković canceled their visit. Šešelj also bragged of cursing the Croats .

In 2020, the birth home of Ban of Croatia Josip Jelačić, built in the 18th century and located in Petrovaradin, was bought by the Republic of Serbia from private owners. It was later reconstructed and given as a gift to the Croatian community.

During Serbian Protests in July 2020, Serbian president Aleksandar Vučić blamed Croatia for the protests and, saying that "their rivalry is to destroy Serbia and destroy Vučić".

On 29 December 2020, a violent earthquake hit central Croatia with an epicenter in Petrinja. President of Serbia Aleksandar Vučić announced that Serbia is ready to help Croatia both financially and technically. The next day, Government of Serbia decided to donate €1,000,000 to Croatia for repairing damages from the earthquake. Serbian Chamber of Commerce donated additional €50,000. Miloš Stojković, a member of Serb delegation which was supposed to bring the humanitarian aid to areas hit by the earthquake, came unannounced to Croatian city of Knin (once capital of self-proclaimed Krajina). From there he livestreamed on Facebook, saying that: "Knin is the occupied Serb town", and announced the "return of Republic of Serbian Krajina" and removal of Croatian flag from Knin fortress". His video went viral and caused a diplomatic incident. Croatian embassy in Belgrade issued a protest note to Serbian ministry of Foreign Affairs. According to Croatian ambasador Hidajet Bišćević; Serb ministry of Foreign Affairs distanced themself orally from Stojković's statements, however, Croatians also announced that they are expecting a written response from Serbian government. Stojković later called Croatian protest note "shameful".

In July 2021, Croatia announced that an image of Nikola Tesla would appear on its currency when it joined the Euro. Officials from the National Bank of Serbia stated that such a move was inappropriate and filed a complaint with their EU counterparts. The dispute over Tesla's ethnic origin has long affected the two countries' bilateral relations.

In July 2022, Croatia and Serbia entered a diplomatic dispute over Aleksandar Vučić's private trip to lay the flowers at the memorial site of the World War II Jasenovac concentration camp, which the Croatian government blocked on the basis that such presidential visits need to be "part of arrangements between the two sides". The Serbian authorities immediately reacted by putting similar restrictions on all Croatian officials traveling through its territory, requiring them to specifically announce and explain their visit or passage through Serbia. Serbian president's visit has then been postponed to request an official visit.

In October 2022, at the first meeting of the European Political Community in Prague, Czech Republic, the European Union, at the request of Croatia, as part of the eighth package of sanctions against Russia, asks for an additional ban of the import of Russian oil to Serbia through the Croatian port of Omišalj, via the Adriatic pipeline (JANAF), which caused a diplomatic clash between the two countries. The Serbian mass media campaigned against Croatia and strained their political relations, with accusations against Croatia of revanchism, Serbophobia and continuous campaign against the Serbian state leadership are further consequences of the latest events.

Border dispute

Due to the meandering of the Danube, the eastern border of Baranya with Serbia according to cadastral delineation is not followed, as each country controls territory on their side of the main river flow.

Further south, near Vukovar and near Šarengrad, there are two river islands (Island of Vukovar and Island of Šarengrad) which have been part of SR Croatia (during Yugoslavia) but during the war they came under Serbian control.

Croatia requests that the islands be returned because of the Arbitration Commission of the Peace Conference on Yugoslavia decision from 1991 that all internal borders between Yugoslav republics have become international. Serbia's position is that the natural border between the countries is the middle of the main flow of Danube, which would make the islands Serbian territory. Military occupation of the islands ended after an incident in which Serbian military opened fire and arrested the Mayor of Vukovar Vladimir Štengel with nineteen other Croatian civilians and eight children who were going to visit Zvezdan Kisić, the Mayor of the Serbian town Bačka Palanka. These islands are now under Serbian police control.

Consulate General of Serbia in Vukovar
Serbia established a diplomatic mission in Vukovar, Croatia on 5 February 1998, twenty days after the end of the reintegration process of Eastern Slavonia, Baranya and Western Syrmia into Croatia, which was the end of the Croatian War of Independence. The consulate is responsible for five Slavonian counties: Vukovar-Syrmia, Osijek-Baranja, Brod-Posavina, Požega-Slavonia and Virovitica-Podravina.

Due to the huge interest of local citizens, in the beginning consulate operated also in Beli Manastir. The consulate at the end of the war played a very positive role in the life of the local Serbian minority in the city and region.

Representatives of the consulate are frequent interlocutors of local and national media when it comes to issues of protection and promotion of Serbian identity in the Danube region. Consulate organizes and participates in various cultural and educational projects and humanitarian actions, some of which are the celebration of the signing of Erdut Agreement, showing of documentary films, donation of equipment, organizing concerts etc. On the occasion of 150th anniversary of the birth of Nikola Tesla, the consulate, in conjunction with the U.S. Embassy in Zagreb, co-financed Days of Nikola Tesla in Osijek.

Over time the consulate achieved close cooperation with minority institutions and organizations such as Joint Council of Municipalities, Eparchy of Osječko polje and Baranya, and Radio Borovo.

International organizations
Both countries are full members of the South-East European Cooperation Process, Stability Pact for Southeastern Europe, Central European Initiative and Southeast European Cooperative Initiative.

Croatia also supports Accession of Serbia to the European Union.

Popular culture

Rivalry in basketball

The big rivalry in basketball started at the FIBA European Championship in 1995. At the time, Croatia was a newly independent state, while Serbia was a federal unit of FR Yugoslavia. Both countries did well in the tournament, with Yugoslavia ranking first. The third-place Croatian team caused an international scandal when they walked off the medal stand and out of the arena just before Serbs and Montenegrins were about to receive their gold medals. Curiously, there hasn't been a single direct game involving the two countries over the course of the championship.

Croatia and Yugoslavia did face each other in a game at EuroBasket 1997. Four seconds before the end of the tense game, Croatian team was leading by two points when Serbian Saša Đorđević took the ball and made a three-pointer, winning the game for Yugoslavia. Yugoslavia went on to win the championship, while Croatia ended up ranking 11th overall.

Afterward, at EuroBasket 2001, Croats were heavily beaten by 80–66. Their last match at a major competition was at the 2016 Olympics, where Serbia also won 86–83.

This rivalry went on also to clubs. Serbian clubs dominate in the regional ABA League, where they won 14 times (out of which Partizan eight times and Crvena zvezda five times), and Croatian clubs won two titles.

Rivalry in football 

Rivalries between Croatian and Serbian football contenders became especially famous to the world in the early 1990s, starting with the historic Dinamo Zagreb–Red Star Belgrade riot, which emphasized in some peoples' eyes the breakup of Yugoslavia. The Croatia national football team and the FR Yugoslavia national football team played on only a few occasions—the first being in 1999 in the UEFA Euro 2000 qualifying Group 8. Nevertheless, the rivalry between the two teams has been described as one of fiercest in the world. Fourteen years later, for the first time in history, Serbia as an independent country played against the Croatian team on 22 March 2013 in qualification group A of the 2014 FIFA World Cup. The match, which Croatia won 2–0, was closely followed around the world. The football federations of Serbia and Croatia agreed to ban foreign guest fans at the two games because of security concerns. Later, Croatia drew Serbia 1–1 in Belgrade which meant Serbia was eliminated. During the match, Miralem Sulejmani, who was in a goal scoring opportunity, was knocked down by a tactical tackle from Josip Šimunić for which he was given a red card.

Some Serbs, including the tennis star Novak Djokovic, who supported Croatia national team at the 2018 FIFA World Cup, were publicly criticized by some politicians and media.

Croatian stance on Kosovo

Croatia recognized Kosovo as an independent and sovereign republic on 19 March 2008. Croatia opened their embassy in Pristina on 7 November 2008, while Kosovo opened theirs in Zagreb on 19 February 2010.

Diplomatic missions

Croatian ambassadors to Belgrade 
 Davor Božinović (2002–2004)
 Tonči Staničić (2004–2008)
 Željko Kuprešak (2008–2013)
 Gordan Markotić (2013–2017)
 Gordan Bakota (2017–2020)
 Hidajet Biščević (2020–)

Serbian ambassadors to Zagreb 
 Milan Simurdić (2001–2005)
 Radivoj Cvjetićanin (2005–2009)
 Stanimir Vukićević (2009–2013)
 Bosa Prodanović (chargé d'affaires) (2013–2015)
 Mira Nikolić (2015–2020)
 Davor Trkulja (chargé d'affaires) (2020–2022)
 Jelena Surla (chargé d'affaires) (2022–)

Diplomacy
Source

Republic of Croatia
Belgrade (Embassy)
Subotica (Consulate)

Republic of Serbia
Zagreb (Embassy)
Vukovar (Consulate General)
Rijeka (Consulate General)

See also
 Foreign relations of Croatia
 Foreign relations of Serbia 
 Croatia–Kosovo relations
 Serbs of Croatia
 Croats of Serbia
 List of Serbian Orthodox churches in Croatia
 Tragovi: Journal for Serbian and Croatian Topics
 Agreement on Succession Issues of the Former Socialist Federal Republic of Yugoslavia

References

External links
   Croatian Ministry of Foreign Affairs and European Integration: list of bilateral treaties with Serbia
 Croatian embassy in Belgrade
 Serbian Ministry of Foreign Affairs about relations with Croatia
 Serbian embassy in Zagreb
 Serbian general consulate in Rijeka
 Serbian general consulate in Vukovar
 Slobodna Evropa – Da li su Hrvati neravnopravni u Srbiji? Retrieved 29 January 2006
 Lecture: Ognjen Karanović - "SRPSKO-HRVATSKI ODNOSI U KRALjEVINI SRBA, HRVATA I SLOVENACA"

 

 
Serbia 
Bilateral relations of Serbia